The La Palma salamander (Bolitoglossa subpalmata) is a species of salamander in the family Plethodontidae.
It is found in Costa Rica and western Panama.

Its natural habitats are subtropical or tropical moist montane forests, pastureland, plantations, rural gardens, and heavily degraded former forest. The species occur at high elevations and cold temperatures atypical of habitats for most other plethodontids. It is threatened by habitat loss.

References

Amphibians of Costa Rica
Bolitoglossa
Endemic fauna of Costa Rica
Taxonomy articles created by Polbot
Amphibians described in 1896